Barwick in Elmet and Scholes is a civil parish in the City of Leeds metropolitan borough in West Yorkshire, England. According to the 2001 census it had a population of 5,120, decreasing to 4,902 at the 2011 Census. The parish includes Barwick-in-Elmet and Scholes, situated in the north-eastern part of the borough.

The parish council usually meets monthly.

See also
Listed buildings in Barwick in Elmet and Scholes

References

Civil parishes in West Yorkshire